Mitch Silpa (born January 9, 1973) is an American writer, actor, and director who starred in NBC's The Rerun Show, and has appearances in shows such as Brothers & Sisters, Curb Your Enthusiasm, Desperate Housewives, Gilmore Girls, I'm with Her, One on One, Kitchen Confidential, Reno 911!, Joey, and 2 Broke Girls.

Early life 
Silpa was born in Los Angeles, California. He began his career as a member of The Groundlings, an improv and sketch comedy troupe based in Los Angeles.

Career 
Silpa is perhaps best known on the Internet for his David Blaine street magic parodies. In these parodies, Silpa masquerades as an intentionally low-quality likeness of the world-renowned magician. Actors Mikey Day and Michael Naughton also appear in these parodies, as best friends Evan and Peter whom Silpa terrorizes with his "magic". He is also known for the "Two Old Queens Who've Just a Minute to Catch Up" viral video series created and performed by Silpa and Drew Droege.

He has had recurring roles on the TV shows "All Rise", "Grey's Anatomy", "Nobodies", "Desperate Housewives", "Gilmore Girls", and "In Plain Sight". Silpa was also a series regular on NBC's The Rerun Show.

Silpa has had guest star roles in sitcoms such as "Will & Grace", 2 Broke Girls, "The Middle", "Reno 911", and Curb Your Enthusiasm. Although known for a more mature sense of humor, Silpa also acts in television shows that are for a younger audience such as I'm In the Band on Disney XD and iCarly on Nickelodeon. Silpa also plays more serious roles like the character Deputy Everhardt in the television drama, In Plain Sight.

As for big screen appearances, one of Silpa's more notable characters is a flight attendant named Steve in the 2011 comedy film, Bridesmaids. He also appeared in "Spy", "The Heat", "The Way Out", "Happytime Murders", "Welcome to Me", "Unforgettable", and "The Boss".

He created, wrote, and produced (with Jim Cashman) the FOX pilot "Amy's Brother" starring Michael Urie and Annie Mumolo. Silpa has also been nominated for a Writers Guild of America Award for his work on Saturday Night Live.

Filmography

Film

Television

References

External links 
 

1973 births
Living people
American male television actors
Male actors from Los Angeles
21st-century American male actors
American male film actors